Liberati is a political network founded in Sweden in July 2008. The network was formed in reaction to the controversial passing in June 2008 by the Swedish Parliament, of the so-called FRA Law, a law allowing the National Defence Radio Establishment (Sweden), the national signals intelligence agency, to tap all internet traffic passing in or out of the country, across the national borders. Liberati was initiated by Alexander Bard and Jan Söderqvist and uses various internet social fora to try to influence the traditional political parties, from Libertarianism at one end via pragmatic Liberalism to liberal Socialism at the other end of the spectrum.

Despite early calls for Liberati to become a political party of its own, there are currently no plans to extend the network towards the formation of a separate political party. In addition to Bard and Söderqvist, early members associated with the Liberati movement include political scientist Stig-Björn Ljunggren, author and columnist Oscar Swartz and Member of Parliament Camilla Lindberg, an outspoken opponent to the FRA law from within the Swedish Liberal Party, and a heroine of the anti-FRA law movement after Lindberg became the only representative of the ruling Swedish Center-Right coalition to vote against the FRA law in the parliamentary vote of June 2008.

On 26 September 2010 Liberati was disbanded and replaced with both a cross-party liberal network simply called Liberala Nätverket (The Liberal Network), and a new party, Liberaldemokraterna, (The Liberal Democrats).

Sources 

Johan Arvidsson, Aaron Eklöf.: , Nyheter24, Published 2009-02-21 09:34

Jan Söderqvist et al. , Expressen, Published 2010-0209

Alexander Bard: Därför lägger vi ner liberati, Published 2010-09-26

External links 

Official homepage, http://www.liberati.se/

Political organizations based in Sweden